Single in Seoul  is an upcoming South Korean romantic comedy film directed by Park Beom-soo-I, starring Lee Dong-wook, Im Soo-jung, Esom, Jang Hyun-sung and Kim Ji-young. The film follows Yeong-ho (Lee Dong-wook), who likes to be alone, and Hyeon-jin (Im Soo-jung) a gregarious publisher, who writes an essay about single life. The principal photography began on November 14, 2020.

Synopsis
The story revolves around two people, having different temperament and lifestyle. They meet via an essay about single life, and then old memories are rekindled, opening the past wounds.

Park Yeong-ho (Lee Dong-wook) is an instructor and influencer with 300,000 followers, who enjoys being single. Joo Hyeon-jin (Im Soo-jung) is Park Yeong-ho's college junior and an editor-in-chief of a publishing company and in-charge of the essay series titled “Single in the City”.

Cast

Main
 Im Soo-jung as Joo Hyeon-jin, editor
 Lee Dong-wook as Park Yeong-ho

Supporting
 Esom as best-selling author
 Jang Hyun-sung as Jin-pyo, president of the publishing company
 Kim Ji-young as co-owner of the publishing company
 Lee Mi-do as Yoon Jeong, Joo Hyeon-jin's coworker, senior employee of the editorial team 
 Lee Sang-yi as Byeong-soo, an intern
 Ji Yi-soo as Ye-ri, member of editorial team
 Yoon Jung-eun as member of editorial team

Production

Casting
In June 2020, Lee Dong-wook and Im Soo-jung were offered to play Park Yeong-ho, an instructor and influencer, and Lim Soo-jung, the editor-in-chief of a publishing company respectively. Lee Dong-wook and Im Soo-jung worked in Search: WWW, though Dong-wook's appearance was short.

Filming
Filming began in mid-November 2020 and is scheduled to last for three months.

References

External links
 
 
 
 

2020s Korean-language films
South Korean romantic comedy films
Myung Films films
Upcoming films